The Paris pneumatic post was a pneumatic tube message-carrying service that operated in the French capital from 1866. It was established because of the popularity of the electric telegraph in the city which had led to the signal cables becoming overloaded and messages being sent by road. The pneumatic system allowed the telegraph companies to send messages underground through sealed lines laid in the Paris sewers, bypassing any traffic on the roads above. The network was taken into public ownership in 1879, under the Ministry of Posts and Telegraphs, and opened to messages sent by the general public. Messages continued to be considered officially as telegrams and for a fixed cost users could write a message on a "petit bleu" form to be sent anywhere in the city. After arriving at the office nearest the recipient it would be taken to their address by a courier.

Originally driven by steam-powered vacuum pumps and compressors the network was modernised to electricity-driven machinery from 1927. The number of messages sent peaked in 1945 at 30 million. Budget restrictions from 1945 hampered the network as maintenance and upgrades were cut. With declining usage the network was closed in 1984. A parallel system operated for official purposes and connected several government buildings. Part of this network, connecting the senate, national assembly and officers of the Journal Officiel de la République Française, survived in use until 2004.

History

Beginnings 

The use of electrical telegraphy in Paris rose rapidly in the period of the Second French Empire, from 17 stations in 1851 to 2,200 in 1867. The telegraph lines became overloaded and the operating companies had to resort to sending messages by carriage between the two major telegraph stations on the Rue de Grenelle and the Place de la Bourse, with messages sometimes delayed by road traffic. As early as 1853 a pneumatic tube message system was installed by Josiah Latimer Clark to link the London Stock Exchange with the offices of the Electric Telegraph Company.

The air was compressed not by motorised means but by the pressure of  head of water held in reservoirs. A reservoir at either end of the line allowed for messages to be sent in both directions.

The Grand Hotel line was extended in 1867 to form a six station "hexagon" incorporating the telegraph offices at the Place de la Bourse and Rue de Grenelle.  The other stations on the route were at the Place du Théâtre-Français, Rue des Saints-Pères and Rue Boissy-d'Anglas.  This network utilised the same  tubes of the Grand Hotel line and permitted curves of  radius.  A "train" of message containers took 12 minutes to complete a full clockwise circuit of the network.  The tubes were laid in the Paris sewers, reducing the need for new trenches and allowing ready access for repairs and maintenance.

In the following decades additional polygonal circuits were added to the original hexagon, doubling it in size by 1872 – though the circuits remained within the area of the Wall of the Ferme générale.

Opening to the public 

On 5 February 1879 the Ministry of Posts and Telegraphs was formed bringing together the two services, previously under the control of the Ministry of Finance and Ministry of the Interior respectively. The Ministry opened the use of the network to the public from 1 May that year.  The technical aspects of the pneumatic post were maintained by the telegraphy department of the ministry while the operational aspects were under the post office department.

Officially messages sent on the pneumatic network were considered to be telegrams. However, unlike telegrams the speed of transmission was not affected by the length of the message. In addition the cost to the user was not linked to length, except that each message had to be written on pre-franked forms, while telegrams were charged per word. The pneumatic message forms were known as "petits bleus" (small blues) for their size and colour. The forms were posted in small boxes attached to post boxes, left at telegraph counters or in special boxes at the rear of trams (which were emptied at the tram terminals). The network would carry the message to the station closest to the recipient from where it would be delivered by courier.  The couriers, some as young as 14, delivered the messages by foot and cycle with mopeds being used from 1930.  To pass between pneumatic networks the message was taken from its container, time stamped and inserted into the next tube. It was therefore possible to determine the route each message had taken by examining the time stamps.

In 1881 the decision was taken to extend coverage across the entire city by a four-phase expansion of the network. By February 1882 the 16th arrondissement and parts of the 17th and 18th were incorporated. By 1 April 1883 the remainder of the 17th and 18th arrondissements and part of the 19th were incorporated. By 1 February 1884 the remainder of the 19th arrondissement and the 12th and 20th were incorporated. By 15 December 1884 the rest of the city (15th, 13th, 14th arrondissements) were incorporated.

Coverage was extended to parts of Seine and Seine-et-Oise in 1907 without extending the pneumatic network. Cycle couriers carried the messages to these suburbs from the existing stations.

Modernisation 
The pneumatic network was extended to the suburbs for the first and only time in 1914 when an extension was made to Neuilly.  Further extensions outside the city limits were planned but were cancelled with the outbreak of the First World War.

On average around 10 million messages a year were delivered, peaking at 30 million in 1945. Complaints were made about smoke from the workshops and from 1926 flue gas scrubber devices were installed. These were expensive to run and maintain and so the workshops were converted to run on electricity from 1927. The first to be converted was Grenelle, which had a  electric motor installed. The motors drove compressors that forced air into the tubes and vacuum pumps that removed it.

Louis Gaillard, a recent graduate of the École Nationale Supérieure des Télécommunications, was placed in charge of the workshops in 1932.  A few months later he was placed in charge of the entire network, a position he held until 1974.  He became a driving force for the modernisation of the network. He ensured the continuation of the electrification programme, which completed in 1942 with the electrification of the Hôtel des Postes station. At completion the network had motors totalling , of which around  would be applied at any one time with the remaining units in reserve or maintenance.  Gaillard also pioneered a system of automatic sorting of messages by address.

Decline 

Budgetary restrictions in 1945 led to a slow down in the modernisation programme and a reduction in routine maintenance and upgrade work. By 1966 57% of the  pneumatic tubes and 65% of the  tubes were worn which led to an increase in blockages. In 1970 there were 270 blockages on the network that required workmen to enter the sewers to unblock the tubes. The price of a pneumatic message relative to a postal letter also increased from around 3:1 in 1902 to 5:1 in 1957 and 7.8:1 in 1975, reducing the popularity of the method. The increasing use of telephone and telex systems also reduced the attractiveness of the pneumatic message.

The use of the network declined to 4 million messages sent in 1960; 2.7 million in 1972 and just 648,000 in 1982. The original metal tubes were gradually replaced by PVC from 1965. This reduced the vulnerability of the network to oxidation and offered less resistance to the message containers, reducing noise.

The pneumatic network was closed by the Ministry of Posts and Telegraphs at 5 pm on 30 March 1984.  The closure followed the introduction of two new services by the ministry: Postéclair, a public fax system, and Postexpress, a rapid parcel delivery network in Paris. Most employees of the pneumatic post were redeployed into Postexpress.

Government network 

A separate government network of pneumatic lines also existed and connected the Senate, National Assembly and the Journal Officiel de la République Française. This line was used to carry shorthand notes of parliamentary proceedings to the Journal where they were typed and sent back for review by the parliamentary stenographers. After approval the text was returned to the Journal for publication, the entire process taking around three days.

Other lines connected other government offices. The underground lines were valued for their security (no outside traffic was carried so the authenticity of each communication was assured) and ability to maintain communications if the streets were blocked by civil disturbance.  However the network failed at a critical time in the debate of a Finance Bill in the 1940s or 50s, due to the flooding of the sewers.  With the advent of fax and email communication the network was gradually dismantled, the dedicated route from the senate and national assembly to the Journal was the last to be decommissioned, being taken out of service in 2004.

See also 
 Pneumatic tube mail in New York City, similar system in New York City

References

Bibliography 

 

1866 establishments in France
1984 disestablishments in France
History of Paris
Pneumatics
Pipeline transport
Postal history
Postal system of France